Jacques-Alain Bénisti (born 10 April 1952) is a member of the National Assembly of France.  He represents the Val-de-Marne department, and is a member of the Union for a Popular Movement.

In 2011, Benisti created controversy when he publicly equated the legalization of same-sex marriage and bestiality to the legalization of rape.

References

1952 births
Living people
The Republicans (France) politicians
Mayors of places in Île-de-France
Deputies of the 12th National Assembly of the French Fifth Republic
Deputies of the 13th National Assembly of the French Fifth Republic
Deputies of the 14th National Assembly of the French Fifth Republic